Borough Hall of the Borough of Waynesboro is a historic borough hall in Waynesboro in Franklin County, Pennsylvania. It was built in 1881 by the town council as a public theater and fire station and named the Academy of Music. The first lecture at the theater, "The Rise and Fall of the Moustache", was given by Robert Burdette, one of over 3,000 times he gave the lecture throughout the country. The theater hosted the first motion picture shown in Waynesboro in 1906.

The three-story, square brick building in an Italianate style, modified by Second Empire-style motifs.  The building features a mansard roof with straight sides, a central pavilion extending approximately two stories above the roofline, cast-iron roof cresting, and eyebrow-like window heads.

When built, the building housed a number of functions including theater, public market, and library. It has housed solely borough offices since 1976.

It was listed on the National Register of Historic Places in 1980.

References 

City and town halls on the National Register of Historic Places in Pennsylvania
Second Empire architecture in Pennsylvania
Government buildings completed in 1881
Buildings and structures in Franklin County, Pennsylvania
National Register of Historic Places in Franklin County, Pennsylvania
City and town halls in Pennsylvania
1881 establishments in Pennsylvania